The Pennec Gaz'Aile 2 is a French amateur-built aircraft, designed by Serge Pennec of Locmaria-Plouzané and supplied in the form of plans for amateur construction.

Design and development
The Gaz'Aile 2 features a cantilever low-wing, a two-seats-in-side-by-side configuration enclosed cockpit under a bubble canopy, fixed tricycle landing gear with wheel pants and a single engine in tractor configuration.

The aircraft is made from wood and klegcell foam. The standard engines recommended are the  Peugeot PSA 106 automotive conversion diesel engine and a  Peugeot gasoline engine, as well as a number of other PSA Peugeot Citroën powerplants.

Variants
Microlight version
Light-sport version

Specifications (LSA version)

References

External links

2000s French civil utility aircraft
Homebuilt aircraft
Single-engined tractor aircraft